The 1995 Major League Baseball season was the first season to be played under the expanded postseason format, as the League Division Series (LDS) was played in both the American and National leagues for the first time, since the 1981 strike-split season. However, due to the 1994–95 Major League Baseball strike which carried into the 1995 season, a shortened 144-game schedule commenced on April 25, when the Florida Marlins played host to the Los Angeles Dodgers.

The Atlanta Braves became the first franchise to win World Series championships for three cities. Along with their 1995 title, the Braves won in 1914 as the Boston Braves, and in 1957 as the Milwaukee Braves.

Regular season
After the 1994 season was ended due to the players' strike, there was still a deal that had to be worked out. However, it wasn't until major league owners parlayed plans to have replacement players play in 1995 that the players got into serious negotiations. Due to the strike, there was no official defending champion for the year. However, the negotiations pushed the start of the season back to late April, already 18 games into a regular season.

Despite the strike, which alienated many fans, Baltimore Orioles shortstop Cal Ripken Jr. surpassed Lou Gehrig's consecutive games played streak when he played in his 2,131st straight game on September6. Games during the playoffs were also broadcast simultaneously, meaning that games were broadcast only regionally. Despite the oddities, the 1995 season is now considered a financial success where the two best teams in baseball (in their leagues) met up in the World Series, the Cleveland Indians and Atlanta Braves. For the first time since 1954, the Indians were the AL representatives in the World Series. This came on the heels of dominating the AL Central (beating second place Kansas City by 30 games).

They met the Boston Red Sox, who had AL MVP Mo Vaughn (39 home runs, 126 RBI) and got to start the series at home. Regardless, Cleveland swept the Red Sox. Meanwhile, in the other ALDS series between Seattle and Yankees, the Yankees stormed out to a quick 2–0 series lead at Yankee Stadium, winning game2 on a 15th inning walk-off home run by Jim Leyritz. However, as the series shifted to The Kingdome in Seattle, the Mariners, who had made a 13-game comeback on the California Angels to force a one-game playoff (which Randy Johnson got the win), the Mariners won games3 and4 to cause a classic game5, in which the Mariners came back three times to win on Edgar Martínez's famous double that scored Joey Cora and Ken Griffey Jr. In the ALCS, the Mariners surprised the Indians by taking game1, however, on the power of pitchers Dennis Martínez and Orel Hershiser, the Indians managed to knock off Seattle in 6.

In the NLDS, it was the near-opposite to the New York/Seattle series. The Cincinnati Reds, who'd run away with the NL Central, swept the Dodgers and the Atlanta Braves took both games vs. Colorado at Coors Field before the Rockies finally won a game in game3. However, the Braves finished off the Rockies at home in game4. Then, in the NLCS, after taking both games at Riverfront Stadium, the Braves finished the sweep of the Reds at home.

In the 1995 World Series, the Braves took the first two at home vs. Cleveland. Then, during the three games at Jacobs Field, the Indians won games3 and5 but those games sandwiched around the Braves 5–2 game4 victory. In game6, the Braves, on the power of an 8-inning, one-hitter thrown by Tom Glavine and David Justice hitting a solo home run in the sixth inning, won 1–0 and won the World Series. The victory made the Braves the first team to win World Series in three home cities (Boston (1914), Milwaukee (1957), and Atlanta (1995)).

Statistical leaders

Standings

American League

National League

  The Seattle Mariners defeated the California Angels in a one-game playoff to earn the AL West division title.

Postseason

Bracket

Awards and honors
Baseball Hall of Fame
Richie Ashburn
Leon Day
William Hulbert
Mike Schmidt
Vic Willis

Other awards
Outstanding Designated Hitter Award: Edgar Martínez (SEA)
Roberto Clemente Award (Humanitarian):  Ozzie Smith (STL).
Rolaids Relief Man Award: José Mesa (CLE, American); Tom Henke (STL, National).

Player of the Month

Pitcher of the Month

Managers

American League

National League

Home field attendance and payroll

Television coverage

Events

January–June
April 2 – After 232 days, the 1994–95 Major League Baseball strike comes to an end.
April 8 – The Colorado Rockies sign free agent outfielder Larry Walker.
April 25 – Major League Baseball begins its strike-shortened 144-game season. Opening day games see fan protests regarding the strike spill onto the field. In addition, there were boos at opening day games.
April 26 – The Colorado Rockies open Coors Field with an 11–9 victory over the New York Mets in 14 innings.
June 30 – Eddie Murray became a member of the 3,000 hit club.

July–September
July 11 – The National League defeats the American League in the All-Star Game 3–2, on an 8th-inning pinch-hit home run by Jeff Conine. Conine becomes the 10th player to homer in his first All-Star at bat, and is named the Game's MVP. Frank Thomas, Craig Biggio and Mike Piazza also connect for home runs.
August 10 – The Los Angeles Dodgers are forced to forfeit to the visiting St. Louis Cardinals when inebriated fans react to several close calls by throwing souvenir baseballs onto the field. No Major League Baseball game has resulted in a forfeit since.
August 18 – St. Louis' Tom Henke achieved his 300th career save against Atlanta.
September 4 – Robin Ventura of the Chicago White Sox becomes the eighth player in major league history to hit two grand slams in a single game, doing so in the 4th and 5th innings of the White Sox 14–3 win over the Texas Rangers. The last to do it was Frank Robinson in 1970.
September 6 – Cal Ripken Jr. of the Baltimore Orioles plays in his 2,131st consecutive major league game to surpass Lou Gehrig's 56-year record. When the game becomes official in the middle of the fifth inning, Ripken takes a victory lap around Camden Yards during the 22-minute standing ovation from the sellout crowd, including President Bill Clinton. In the game, Ripken goes 2-for-4, including a home run, in Baltimore's 4–2 win over California.
September 28 – Greg A. Harris of the Montréal Expos becomes the first major league pitcher since 1893 to pitch with both hands in one game. Harris faces four batters, two from his usual right side and two from the left, in the ninth inning of a 9–7 loss to the Cincinnati Reds.

October–December
October 23 – The St. Louis Cardinals hire Tony La Russa as their manager.
October 28 – In a pitchers' duel, the Atlanta Braves win Game6 of the World Series 1–0, on a combined one-hitter by Tom Glavine and Mark Wohlers. David Justice's sixth-inning home run accounts for the game's only run. In winning, the Braves become the first team to win World Championships representing three cities – Boston (1914), Milwaukee (1957) and Atlanta. Catcher Tony Peña's leadoff single in the 6th is Cleveland's only hit. Glavine is named Series MVP.
November 2 – The New York Yankees name Joe Torre as their new manager, replacing Buck Showalter.
December 22 – Anheuser-Busch agrees to sell the Cardinals for $150 million to an investment group that agrees to keep the team in St. Louis.
December 22 – The Florida Marlins sign free agent pitcher Kevin Brown. The Philadelphia Phillies sign free agent third baseman Todd Zeile. The Boston Red Sox sign free agent pitcher Jamie Moyer.

Undated events
 Greg Maddux won his 4th consecutive Cy Young Award, a record at the time (has since been equaled by Randy Johnson)
 The Cleveland Indians' Albert Belle became the first player with 50 home runs and 50 doubles in the same season.
 The Cleveland Indians clinch the AL Central on the 123rd game of the season, the quickest a team ever clinched a division.

Deaths
January 2 – Don Elston, 65, All-Star relief pitcher for the Cubs who led NL in appearances in 1958 and 1959.
January 12 – John "Hi" Simmons, 89, coach at Missouri from 1937 to 1973 who won the 1954 College World Series.
January 18 – Ron Luciano, 57, American League umpire from 1968 to 1980 known for his flamboyance and several books.
February 7 – Cecil Upshaw, 52, relief pitcher, mainly for the Atlanta Braves, who saved 27 games in 1969 but missed the next season after nearly severing a finger.
March 5 – Roy Hughes, 84, infielder for four teams who scored 112 runs for 1936 Indians.
March 13 – Leon Day, 78, All-Star pitcher for the Newark Eagles of the Negro leagues who was elected to the Hall of Fame just six days earlier; set several league strikeout marks, including 18 strikeouts in one game.
March 29 – Terry Moore, 82, All-Star center fielder for the Cardinals who batted .304 in 1940, captained 1942 and 1946 champions.
April 9 – Bob Allison, 60, All-Star outfielder for the Senators/Twins who was the 1959 Rookie of the Year, had three 30-HR seasons and led the AL in triples and runs once each.
May 7 – Gus Bell, 66, All-Star outfielder, mainly with the Reds, who had four 100-RBI seasons and led the NL in triples in 1951; oldest in a major league family that includes son Buddy and grandson David.
May 30 – Glenn Burke, 42, center fielder for the Dodgers and Athletics who was the first former major leaguer to publicly acknowledge his homosexuality.
June 9 – Zoilo Versalles, 55, Cuban All-Star shortstop who led Twins to the 1965 AL pennant; first Latin American player to be named MVP, led AL in triples three times and in doubles and runs once each.
June 10 – Lindsey Nelson, 76, broadcaster for the Mets from 1962 to 1979, and also for the San Francisco Giants and NBC.
July 27 – Rick Ferrell, 89, Hall of Fame catcher for the Browns, Red Sox and Senators whose 1806 games caught were an AL record until 1988; from 1934–38, half of a battery with brother Wes.
August 3 – Harry Craft, 80, manager of the Houston Colt .45s in their 1962 debut; former Reds center fielder also managed the Kansas City Athletics and Chicago Cubs.
August 4 – Dick Bartell, 87, All-Star shortstop for five teams, known for his combative personality, who batted .300 five times and scored 100 runs three times; batted .381 for Giants in 1936 World Series.
August 13 – Mickey Mantle, 63, Hall of Fame center fielder for the Yankees who was the AL's MVP in 1956, 1957 and 1962 and won the 1956 Triple Crown; 16-time All-Star won four home run titles, hitting 50 twice, and retired with third most HRs (536) and walks (1733) in history; 10-time .300 hitter led AL in runs six times; most powerful switch-hitter in baseball history, with career marks for runs (1677), RBI (1509) and slugging percentage (.557), and successor to Babe Ruth and Joe DiMaggio as symbol of the Yankees' long reign; hit record 18 home runs in World Series play.
August 20 – Von McDaniel, 56, pitcher who joined his brother Lindy on the 1957–58 St. Louis Cardinals, winning seven games.
September 21 – Tony Cuccinello, 87, All-Star second baseman for five teams who lost the 1945 batting title by one point in his final season; later a coach.
September 21 – Andrew Rozdilsky, 77, who performed as Andy the Clown at White Sox games from 1960 to 1990.
October 21 – Vada Pinson, 57, twice a National League All-Star outfielder; finished his career with 2,757 hits in 18 seasons.
December 27 – Oscar Judd, 87, Canadian pitcher who was an American League All-Star in 1943.

References

External links
1995 Major League Baseball season schedule at Baseball Reference

 
Major League Baseball seasons